Pachycoelius is an Australian genus of potter wasps.

References

Biological pest control wasps
Potter wasps
Insects of Australia